The 2000 Arena Football League season was the 14th season of the Arena Football League. It was succeeded by 2001. The league champions were the Orlando Predators, who defeated the Nashville Kats in ArenaBowl XIV.

The season was originally cancelled on February 24, 2000, due to an antitrust suit filed by the Arena Football League Players Association against the league stemming from player complaints that league owners have conspired to withhold free agency, health benefits and higher salaries. On March 1, 2000, the league re-opened its season when the Players' Union came to a collective bargaining agreement with the league.

Standings

 Green indicates clinched playoff berth
 Purple indicates division champion
 Grey indicates best regular-season record

Playoffs

All-Arena team

References